Herma Svozilová-Johnová (29 August 1914 – 5 April 2009) was a Czechoslovak writer.

The daughter of an attorney, she was born Herma Svozilová in Prostějov and attended grammar school there. She continued her studies at the lyceum in Saint-Germain-en-Laye and at the French grammar school in Prague. After her marriage to  who served as mayor of Prostějov from 1937 to 1939, she returned to Prostějov. There, she was cultural editor for Hlasu lidu. In 1948, the couple moved to Prague.

Her work first appeared in the journal  in 1929. Her novels Kdo byl Kyrat? (1972) and Vysoké napětí (1974) were adapted into plays for radio.

References 

 
1914 births
2009 deaths
Czechoslovak novelists
Czechoslovak poets
Czechoslovak expatriates in the United Kingdom